Kartsakhi Managed Reserve is a protected area in Ninotsminda Municipality in Samtskhe-Javakheti region of Georgia. It protects land in proximity of Kartsakhi Lake, while lake itself is part of Javakheti National Park.

Kartsakhi Managed Reserve is part of Javakheti Protected Areas which also includes Javakheti National Park, Khanchali Managed Reserve, Sulda Managed Reserve, Bugdasheni Managed Reserve, Madatapa Managed Reserve.

See also
 Javakheti National Park

References 

Managed reserves of Georgia (country)
Protected areas established in 2011
Geography of Samtskhe–Javakheti
Tourist attractions in Samtskhe–Javakheti